Joy is a dance/R&B single by 7669. It was the second single released from her debut album 7669. The single charted on the Billboard R&B/Hip Hop Singles chart on May 14, 1994.

Chart positions

References

1994 singles
1994 songs
Song articles with missing songwriters